"Great Expectations" is the thirteenth episode of the third season of the American television medical drama Grey's Anatomy, and the show's 49th episode overall. It was written by Eric Buchman and directed by Michael Grossman. The episode aired on the American Broadcasting Company (ABC) in the United States on January 25, 2007. In the episode, Dr. Derek Shepherd (Patrick Dempsey), Dr. Preston Burke (Isaiah Washington), Dr. Addison Montgomery (Kate Walsh), and Dr. Mark Sloan (Eric Dane) struggle to be considered for the position of chief of surgery after Dr. Richard Webber (James Pickens Jr.) announces his plans for retirement. Further storylines include Dr. George O'Malley (T.R. Knight) mourning his father, Dr. Miranda Bailey (Chandra Wilson) trying to get financial support for a free clinic, and Dr. Cristina Yang (Sandra Oh) dealing with her troubled relationship with Burke.

Although the episode was fictionally set in Seattle, filming occurred in Los Angeles, California. Loretta Devine (Adele Webber) reprised her role as a guest star, in addition to Rachel Boston (Rachel Meyer) and Jessica Stroup (Jillian Miller). The title of the episode refers to the song, "Great Expectations", by American hard rock band Kiss. The episode received mixed to favorable reviews, with the storyline involving O'Malley's grieving being particularly highlighted. Running for 47 minutes and seven seconds, the episode was viewed by 21.50 million Americans in the United States upon its original airing, ranked first its time-slot and garnered a 7.6 Nielsen rating in the 18–49 demographic.

Plot 

"Great Expectations" opens to a voice-over narration from Dr. Meredith Grey (Ellen Pompeo) about the expectations on becoming a surgeon. Following the death of Harold O'Malley (George Dzundza), his son Dr. George O'Malley (T.R. Knight), is seen using sex as way to cope with the devastating news, much to the displeasure of his girlfriend, Dr. Callie Torres (Sara Ramirez), who seeks help from Dr. Izzie Stevens (Katherine Heigl), O'Malley's best friend. Dr. Richard Webber (James Pickens Jr.) unexpectedly announces his plans of retirement, which lead to Dr. Derek Shepherd (Patrick Dempsey), Dr. Preston Burke (Isaiah Washington), Dr. Addison Montgomery (Kate Walsh) and Dr. Mark Sloan (Eric Dane), four of the hospital's attending surgeons, to compete for the position of chief of surgery. Dr. Cristina Yang (Sandra Oh) is facing difficulties her relationship with Dr. Preston Burke (Isaiah Washington), whose betrayal is seen to have resulted in reciprocated silent treatment. Resident Dr. Miranda Bailey (Chandra Wilson) expresses her desire to open a free clinic, adjacent to the hospital, but deals with rejection from both the chief and the attending physicians, who find no practical reason for funding.

A patient, Jillian Miller (Jessica Stroup), is admitted in obstetrics and gynaecology, and is revealed to suffer from advanced cervical cancer, which leads to her contacting her parents, from whom she ran away from years ago, along with her best friend Rachel Meyer (Rachel Boston). Stevens quickly becomes emotionally involved in the patient's situation and encourages her to return home, after learning that the two girls were Amish, shunned from their natal village. Torres and Yang operate on a runner who is admitted in orthopedics, coping with the news that he will never be able to compete in races after the extensive surgical procedure. Sloan announces his plans of returning to New York City, but abruptly decides to stay in Seattle, following Grey accidentally revealing Webber's retirement plans. Shepherd is displeased with Sloan's decision, which results in an argument between him and Grey, which threatens putting damage on their relationship. Webber returns to his wife, Adele (Loretta Devine), seeking forgiveness, but is left devastated at the realization that she has been spending the night with another man. Bailey ultimately finds support in Stevens, who proves enthusiastic to spend her entire US$8 million inheritance, for the opening of the free clinic. At the conclusion of the episode, Yang confides in Burke, who unexpectedly proposes to her, whereas O'Malley, who finally admits how affected he was by the death of his father, proposes to Torres.

Production 

The episode was written by producer Eric Buchman, while filmmaker Michael Grossman directed it. Buchman explained how his main concept for the episode was to describe O'Malley's grieving in a different way than depicted for Stevens, but in a manner that would be both bothering to her and painful for his partner, Torres. However, he stated that Torres' emotional state during the mourning was also significant to the episode: "We wanted Callie to feel some remorse. She finally got George, but not in the way she wanted. She's gotten his body, but the underlying relationship isn't there anymore." Buchman disclosed that one of the story lines he had originally intended to include in the scrip was Yang and Burke's cold relationship being "kept alive" by having silent sex, which ultimately did not occur, due to being looked upon as "boring, neither dramatic, nor comedic", and also as not being descriptive of the character's feelings. The story line involving the four attending physicians fighting for the title of chief of surgery, was described by Buchman as a comic relief, used to emphasize a childish side of the characters' personalities which had not been previously developed. In addition, Buchman described Webber's retirement as an attempt to reconcile with his estranged wife, but leads to emotional devastation at the realization that she had moved on with a different man.

The concept of Grey and Shepherd's fight was described by Buchman as having "no more taboos", compared to the other story lines developed in the episode: "Even though it was a minor fight, it's very revealing for Meredith. This is probably the longest relationship she's every been in, and the first with someone she feels a genuine connection with. We might know Derek will come back, but she doesn't." The last scene of them in the episode has been deemed "a milestone of sorts for Meredith", with the goal to determine her to admit how new to this romantic development in her personal life she actually is, after years of being known as the woman with habitual excessive drinking and sexual relationships with inappropriate men. Also noted was the aftermath of Alex and Addison's kiss in the previous episode: "What's most painful about that scene? Not that Alex effectively shut Addison down in such a cold and direct manner. But that it seems like such a waste of chemistry. When they went into that closet, the last thing we wanted to see them do is pour water on their fire", stated Buchman, noting how the scene was written to be "frustrating, shocking, and therefore unexpected" for the audience.

Reception 

The episode was originally broadcast on January 25, 2007 at 9:00 ET, and averaged 21.50 million viewers, ranking third in weekly viewership with a 7.6 rating, according to Nielsen ratings. The episode was the sixteenth most-watched episode of the season, airing in the third week after the winter hiatus. Showing a significant decrease in ratings, the episode attracted approximately half a million less viewers than "Six Days (Part 2)", which received a 7.7 rating. "Great Expectations" was also the lead in the time slot, with approximately one-fourth more viewers than CBS's juggernaut CSI, which ranked fourth in weekly viewership with a 7.5 rating.

Staci Krause of IGN had mixed perspectives on the episode's story arcs, comparing the advanced development in the personal story lines to the introduction of disappointing medical cases. She described the story line involving Yang and Burke's silent relationship as "finally showing resolution, taking pleasure to the next level", adding: "It was shocking to see Cristina be the one to break, but even more shocking was Burke's two-word response: marry me. I'm really not sure why Cristina didn't just say yes, since two minutes before had said she was in it for the long haul. It seems like they are dragging this out for the sake of dragging it out." Bailey's evolution in the episode, mainly her interactions with four competing attending physicians, were described as "a reminder of why they called her the Nazi, something that was easy to forget with recent events."

Krause deemed the revelation of Adele's moving on "an interesting twist, with unexpected repercussions", whereas Stevens' offering Bailey the money to open the free clinic, was negatively reviewed; looked upon as the most predictable event of the episode. Krause noted that both medical cases were confusing, assessing that "it would have been nice to learn more about the severe dehydration that caused the runner's legs to swell." In addition, Krause explained how the Amish angle was unexpected, but significantly helpful to the entertainment level, while a lack of realism in the medical case was highlighted: "No one bothered to really mention that it would have been nice, had it been caught earlier. It was, but she allowed herself to deteriorate." The fight between Grey and Shepherd was deemed "a tiff that Derek was entirely responsible for", but also a proof of "how damaged Meredith really is". Krause expressed disappointment in the storyline involving O'Malley proposing to Torres: "Callie certainly didn't look thrilled. If she believes George is proposing as a means to get over his grief, she's probably right and should likely run in the opposite direction." Considering each of the attending physicians' chances of becoming the chief of surgery, Krause noted the possibility of Sloan being chosen as "hilarious, but a tad unbelievable", whereas assessing that Montgomery's "great traits" might suffer, due to her relationship with Karev, which was described as "certainly bringing into question her ability to stay on the straight and narrow". Krause characterized the whole as "one of those guilty pleasures that many may not admit to".

Kelly West of Cinema Blend also expressed mixed point of views on the episode, having different opinions on each storyline. She noted how the scene which sees Torres "desperately trying to escape George's room after three rolls in the hay with the grief-stricken intern" helped the episode reach a high level of entertainment: "The look, or should I say, looks on Izzie's face as Callie rambled on about legs being bent the wrong way and needing to heal after too much sex were priceless and could only matched by the look she gave to George when he opened the door, clearly ready for Callie once more." She highly praised the scene that concludes Stevens' storyline in the episode, seeing "a heart to heart in which she agrees to back off". Shepherd's characterization was negatively responded to, whose enraged attitude was described as "unhealthy" for the evolution of his "fresh relationship" with Grey. West positively received the storyline involving the race for the title of chief, noting that "it was kind of funny to see like the attendings were the kids in the episode".

In response to Bailey's storyline, which she deemed "not surprising", West stated: "He tells Bailey that it's her that will eventually be Chief when she’s ready. Miranda's reaction could only be described as shock. While the other residents were running around trying to get information, she was so busy working on the free clinic project that she hadn’t even heard he was retiring." The story of the two Amish girls was deemed "a little side story, which was actually quite touching and well written", being praised for the realistic portrayals and the effects the storyline had on Stevens. "I don't think I've ever realized that Callie and Cristina never really interacted before. When they did speak to one another the episode, their personalities clash right away. At first they were snippy to one another but the two bonded after slicing open a runner's legs and then operating on him.", assessed West, in response to Torres and Yang's arc, which was described as "an obvious parallel to the rest of the episode". West compared the reaction of Yang and Torres following the proposals, by noting that the former was "surprised and maybe a little bit touched", whereas Torres expressed fear and concern: "She's worried that he's only proposing because he's still getting over the loss of his dad and just needs someone to cling to. I adore George, but he's a mess right now and needs to get stuff straightened out before he makes any lifelong commitments."

References

External links
"Great Expectations" at ABC.com

2007 American television episodes
Grey's Anatomy (season 3) episodes